Ellen Nakashima is an American journalist who covers national security for The Washington Post. She is a 2014 and 2018 recipient of the Pulitzer Prize.

Education 
Nakashima received a B.A. in Humanities from University of California, Berkeley in 1984 before completing a Masters in International Journalism from City University in London.

Career 
Nakashima began her journalism career at The Hartford Courant and The Quincy Patriot Ledger, before joining The Washington Post as a reporter in 1995. She has since served as a White House reporter, South-East Asia correspondent and a privacy and technology reporter until she started covering national security in 2009.

Awards and recognitions 
Nakashima has won a series of awards and investitures for her work at The Post. In 2014, she won the Gerald Loeb Award and the Pulitzer Prize for Public Service, while in 2017, she was named Alumna of the Year by the Daily Californian Alumni Association.  She reported on Russian efforts to influence the outcome of the 2016 presidential election and contacts between aides to President Trump and Russian officials, work which earned her and her colleagues a Pulitzer Prize for National Reporting in 2018.

References

External links 
 Ellen Nakashima on Twitter

Living people
American women journalists of Asian descent
The Washington Post people
The Washington Post journalists
Pulitzer Prize for Public Service winners
Year of birth missing (living people)
University of California, Berkeley alumni
People associated with City, University of London
20th-century American journalists
21st-century American journalists
21st-century American writers
20th-century American writers
American writers of Japanese descent
20th-century American women
21st-century American women